Asaphocrita sciaphilella is a moth in the family Blastobasidae. It is found in the United States, including Kentucky, Texas and California.

The wingspan is about 18 mm. The forewings are tawny vinous gray with a purplish sheen. The hindwings are brownish gray.

References

Moths described in 1873
sciaphilella